The 2000–01 Biathlon World Cup was a multi-race tournament over a season of biathlon, organised by the International Biathlon Union. The season started on 30 November 2000 in Antholz-Anterselva, Italy, and ended on 18 March 2001 in Holmenkollen, Norway. It was the 24th season of the Biathlon World Cup.

Calendar
Below is the IBU World Cup calendar for the 2000–01 season.

World Cup Podium

Men

Women

Men's team

Women's team

Standings: Men

Overall 

Final standings after 25 races.

Individual 

Final standings after 4 races.

Sprint 

Final standings after 10 races.

Pursuit 

Final standings after 7 races.

Mass Start 

Final standings after 4 races.

Relay 

Final standings after 5 races.

Nation 

Final standings after 19 races.

Standings: Women

Overall 

Final standings after 25 races.

Individual 

Final standings after 4 races.

Sprint 

Final standings after 10 races.

Pursuit 

Final standings after 7 races.

Mass Start 

Final standings after 4 races.

Relay 

Final standings after 5 races.

Nation 

Final standings after 19 races.

Medal table

Achievements
First World Cup career victory
, 23, in his 5th season — the WC 1 Individual in Antholz-Anterselva; first podium was 1999–2000 Pursuit in Oberhof
, 21, in her 2nd season — the WC 3 Individual in Antholz-Anterselva; it also was her first podium
, 24, in her 1st season — the World Championships Sprint in Pokljuka; first podium was 2000–01 Sprint in Antholz-Anterselva
, 27, in his 7th season — the World Championships Individual in Pokljuka; it also was his first podium
, 23, in her 6th season — the WC 9 Mass Start in Holmenkollen; first podium was 1995–96 Sprint in Antholz-Anterselva

First World Cup podium
, 24, in her 1st season — no. 3 in the WC 2 Sprint in Antholz-Anterselva
, 29, in his 8th season — no. 2 in the WC 4 Sprint in Oberhof
, 28, in his 7th season — no. 3 in the WC 4 Mass Start in Oberhof
, 26, in his 6th season — no. 3 in the WC 7 Individual in Salt Lake City
, 34, in his 2nd season — no. 3 in the WC 8 Sprint in Lake Placid

Victory in this World Cup (all-time number of victories in parentheses)

Men
 , 8 (22) first places
 , 6 (14) first places
 , 3 (11) first places
 , 2 (19) first places
 , 2 (3) first places
 , 1 (8) first place
 , 1 (2) first place
 , 1 (1) first place
 , 1 (1) first place

Women
 , 14 (33) first places
 , 2 (8) first places
 , 2 (7) first places
 , 2 (2) first places
 , 1 (20) first place
 , 1 (15) first place
 , 1 (2) first place
 , 1 (1) first place
 , 1 (1) first place

Retirements
Following notable biathletes announced their retirement during or after the 2000–01 season:

Footnotes

References

External links
IBU official site

 
Biathlon World Cup
2000 in biathlon
2001 in biathlon